The Banner of Truth Trust is an Evangelical and Reformed non-profit publishing house, structured as a charitable trust and founded in London in 1957 by Iain Murray, Sidney Norton and Jack Cullum. Its offices are now in Edinburgh, Scotland with a key branch office and distribution point in Carlisle, Pennsylvania. It positions itself within the evangelical wing of the church, and has been described as "an extremely powerful organization within British nonconformist evangelicalism."

The trust publishes a monthly magazine called The Banner of Truth which normally appears eleven times per year, with there being a single issue for August and September. The magazine first appeared in September 1955 and as of December 2010 had reached issue number 566.

The Banner of Truth Trust also holds conferences in three countries: UK (annual youth conference and annual ministers' conference), United States (annual conference), and Australia (every two years).

The trust has been connected with the revival of interest in evangelical Calvinism in 20th century England. It has promoted Puritan theology and helped resurrect the ideas of Jonathan Edwards. Alister McGrath refers to the "revival in Puritan spirituality that had been borne aloft on the wings of Banner of Truth's inexpensive paperbacks."

The Banner of Truth Trust's logo depicts George Whitefield preaching.

References

External links 
"The Story of The Banner of Truth" by Iain H. Murray
The Finder of Reformed Christian Sources – magazine & conferences index, compiled by Michael Keen

Christian publishing companies
Non-profit publishers
Book publishing companies of Scotland
Publishing companies established in 1957
Non-profit organisations based in Scotland
Calvinist organizations established in the 20th century